Juliana Francis, also known as Julianna Francis or Juliana Francis-Kelly, is an American playwright and actress. She is the recipient of an Obie Award for her performance in Richard Foreman's ‘Maria Del Bosco’, and a Dramalogue Award for Reza Abdoh's The Hip-hop Waltz of Eurydice. She has also performed with Foreman's Ontological-Hysteric Theater and with Abdoh's Dar A Luz company, of which she was a founding member.

After Abdoh's death, Francis-Kelly began writing plays and screenplays. Her first play, ‘Go Go Go’ (in which she also performed), was directed by Anne Bogart, performed at PS 122 in New York City and the London International Festival of Theatre at the Institute for Contemporary Art I.C.A. Go Go Go was published by Theater Forum Magazine and T3 in Europe. It was subsequently translated into Greek and performed by actress Marili Mastrantoni in Athens and in Kiel, Germany.

Her second play, Box, was directed by Anthony Torn and performed at The Women's Project. Other plays she was involved in include The Ontological Hysteric (published in the anthology Rowing To America by Smith & Kraus.) An Italian-language version was performed at the Fontanon Festival in Rome. The Baddest Natashas, also directed by Torn, was performed at The Ontological Hysteric and published by Open City. Saint Latrice, which she also directed, was performed at The Collapsible Hole and at PS 122. A German-language version was performed in Graz, Austria. In 2004, Francis-Kelly received a Sundance Screenwriting Fellowship to develop Saint Latrice into a screenplay for The Killer Films Company.

Personal life
Juliana Francis married actor David Patrick Kelly on August 14, 2005, in New York City. They have a daughter named Margarethe Jane Kelly born in 2008.

References

External links

 Lortel.org

Living people
21st-century American dramatists and playwrights
Obie Award recipients
21st-century American actresses
Place of birth missing (living people)
Year of birth uncertain
Actresses from Wisconsin
1960s births